The 2014 Music City Bowl was an American college football bowl game played on December 30, 2014 at LP Field in Nashville, Tennessee.  The 17th edition of the Music City Bowl began at approximately 2:00 p.m. CST and was broadcast nationally by ESPN.  It featured the Notre Dame Fighting Irish, and the LSU Tigers from the SEC.  It was one of the final 2014-15 bowl games of the 2014 FBS football season. The game was sponsored by the Franklin American Mortgage Company and is officially known as the Franklin American Mortgage Music City Bowl. Notre Dame defeated Louisiana State by a final score of 31–28.

Teams

The game was the eleventh overall meeting between these two teams, with the series previously tied 5–5. The last time these two teams met was in 2006. It represented the third bowl game between these two teams; the previous bowls were the 1997 Independence Bowl and the 2007 Sugar Bowl.

LSU Tigers

Notre Dame

Game summary

Scoring summary

Source:

Statistics

References

Music City Bowl
Music City Bowl
LSU Tigers football bowl games
Notre Dame Fighting Irish football bowl games
Music City Bowl
Music City Bowl